Georges Naturel (born November 21, 1955 in Nouméa) is a New Caledonian politician. He has been mayor of Dumbéa since March 21, 2008, and is a member of The Rally–UMP.

References

1955 births
Living people
People from Nouméa
Mayors of places in New Caledonia